Brother Jacob may refer to:

Jacob Dacian, a Danish Franciscan friar (c. 1484 in Copenhagen – 1566 in Michoacan, Mexico)
"Brother Jacob", a short story by George Eliot